Iyore (English: The Return: A Life after Life) is a 2014 Nigerian drama film set in the Benin Kingdom, directed by Frank Rajah Arase. It stars Rita Dominic, Joseph Benjamin, Okawa Shaznay, Paul Obazele, Bukky Wright and Yemi Blaq. Before its release, it was nominated in ten categories at the 2014 Golden Icons Academy Movie Awards, slated to be held on the 25th of October 2014.

Cast
 Rita Dominic as Osarugwe
 Joseph Benjamin as Prince Azuwa
 Okawa Shaznay as Princess Ajoke/Amenze/Onaiwu
 Yemi Blaq as Ovie
 Paul Obazele as Oba
 Bukky Wright as Queen Adekoya

See also
 List of Nigerian films of 2014

References

External links

2014 films
2014 Nigerian films
Films shot in Benin City
Nigerian drama films
Films set in Nigeria
Films set in pre-colonial sub-Saharan Africa
2014 drama films